Frieleiidae is a family of brachiopods belonging to the order Rhynchonellida.

Genera

Genera:
 Abyssorhynchia Zezina, 1980
 Compsothyris Jackson, 1918
 Frieleia Dall, 1895

References

Brachiopods